F91 Dudelange is a Luxembourger professional football club based in Dudelange which plays in the Luxembourg National Division.

It was formed in 1991 as a merger between three teams in the town:  Alliance Dudelange, Stade Dudelange and US Dudelange. Domestically, it has since won the National Division on 15 occasions and the Luxembourg Cup eight times.

F91 Dudelange qualified for the 2018–19 UEFA Europa League, becoming the first club from the country to reach the group stage of a European competition. Dudelange also made the 2019–20 UEFA Europa League group stage where they became the first team from Luxembourg to win a game in the group stage after a shock 4–3 victory over APOEL of Cyprus.

History

It was formed in 1991 from the clubs Alliance Dudelange, Stade Dudelange, and US Dudelange. All three clubs had won the National Division or the Luxembourg Cup before, but each had fallen upon hard times, and the amalgamated club was expected to be more stable, in both a sporting and financial sense.

Turning the club into a title-challenging team took a while. Stade Dudelange and US Dudelange had been in Luxembourg's third tier (the 1. Division), whilst Alliance Dudelange was struggling to remain in the second league (the Division of Honour). The new club would take Alliance's place in the Division of Honour in the 1991–92 season.

F91 was promoted in its first season, and soon established itself as a competent top-flight team, not finishing outside the top half of the table until 1996–97. Towards the end of the 1990s, Dudelange gradually improved, and brought to an end Jeunesse Esch's era of dominance by storming to the 1999–00 league title by eleven points.

In 2004–05, Dudelange won the title and competed in the UEFA Champions League for the 2005–06 season. In the competition Dudelange became the first club in Luxembourg's history to reach the second qualifying round, after a remarkable victory over NK Zrinjski (they lost 0–1 at home in the first leg, in the second leg they scored a goal in the 3rd minute of stoppage time to equalize on aggregate, and then scored 3 more goals in extra time). However, Dudelange were easily beaten by Rapid Wien in the second qualifying round.

In the 2005–06 season, Dudelange completed the league and cup Double for the first time since the merger. They replicated this feat in the 2006–07 season, and won a fourth consecutive National Division title in 2007–08.

In the 2012–13 UEFA Champions League, F91 Dudelange defeated Tre Penne 11–0 on aggregate, earning them an appointment with Austrian champion Red Bull Salzburg in the second round. They defeated Salzburg 1–0 in Luxemburg, and lost 3–4 in Salzburg, to win the tie on the away goal rule.  For the first time in club history, Dudelange qualified for the third round of the competition, in which they were beaten 5–1 on aggregate by Maribor.

In 2013–14, Dudelange reclaimed the title with a 3–0 victory over Fola Esch on the final day of the season. This earned the club a spot in the 2014–15 UEFA Champions League.

In 2018, F91 Dudelange became the first Luxembourgish team to reach the group stage of a major European competition, after defeating CFR Cluj 5–2 on aggregate in the UEFA Europa League play-off round. Due to Dudelange's apparent underdog status, daily newspaper Gazeta Sporturilor regarded CFR's elimination as "the biggest shame in the history of Romanian football". Dudelange had also previously defeated Polish side Legia Warsaw in the third qualifying round. The men from the Grand Duchy were drawn into a 'Group of Death', containing European powerhouses Milan, Olympiakos and Spanish side Real Betis. The Luxembourgers did, however, managed to pick up a famous and hard-fought point, on the last matchday, when they drew 0–0 against Real Betis at the Stade Josy Barthel.

In 2019, Dudelange qualified for the Europa League group stages for the second successive season after defeating FC Ararat-Armenia in the play-off round in a penalty shootout.

Dudelange fared much better in their second European group stage adventure, being drawn into a group with Europa League stalwarts Sevilla, Cypriot champions APOEL and Qarabağ of Azerbaijan.

On the first group stage matchday, on 19 September 2019, Dudelange became the first ever team from Luxembourg to win a game in a European group stage after beating APOEL 4–3 in Nicosia. Dudelange, whose coach Emilio Ferrera had resigned only two days prior, came back from a 3–2 deficit to defeat the Cypriots.

After losing their next four group matches, Dudelange faced Qarabag on the last matchday in Baku where they came within two minutes of recording another famous win, before the Azeri side equalised in injury time, thus the men from Luxembourg finished bottom of the group with a respectable 4 points.

Honours

Domestic

League
Luxembourg National Division
Winners (16): 1999–2000, 2000–01, 2001–02, 2004–05, 2005–06, 2006–07, 2007–08, 2008–09, 2010–11, 2011–12, 2013–14, 2015–16, 2016–17, 2017–18, 2018–19, 2021–22
Runners-up (5): 1998–99, 2002–03, 2003–04, 2009–10, 2012–13, 2020–21

Cups
Luxembourg Cup
Winners (8): 2003–04, 2005–06, 2006–07, 2008–09, 2011–12, 2015–16, 2016–17, 2018–19
Runners-up (7): 1992–93, 1993–94, 2001–02, 2010–11, 2013–14, 2014–15, 2021–22

European record

Overview

Matches

Notes
 QR: Qualifying round
 1Q: First qualifying round
 2Q: Second qualifying round
 3Q: Third qualifying round
 PO: Play-off round
 A  After extra time.

Current squad

Managers
 Philippe Guérard (1 July 1994 – Sept 25, 1994)
 Benny Reiter (1 July 1996 – 1 Dec 1997)
 Angelo Fiorucci (1 July 1998 – 30 June 2000)
 Carlo Weis (1 July 2000 – Sept 24, 2003)
 Roger Lutz (25 Oct 2003 – 30 June 2004)
 Michel Leflochmoan (1 July 2004 – 30 June 2009)
 Marc Grosjean (1 July 2009 – 10 June 2011)
 Claude Origer (caretaker) (15 Aug 2009 – 31 Dec 2009)
 Dan Theis (13 June 2011 – 17 Oct 2011)
 Ralph Pinatti Stange (caretaker) (18 Oct 2011 – 25 Nov 2011)
 Didier Philippe (25 Oct 2011 – 13 Nov 2012)
 Patrick Hesse (16 Nov 2012 – 30 May 2013)
 Pascal Carzaniga (1 July 2013 – 28 May 2014)
 Sébastien Grandjean (1 July 2014 – 30 June 2015)
 Michel Leflochmoan (1 July 2015 – 30 June 2016)
 Dino Toppmöller (1 July 2016 – 30 June 2019)
 Emilio Ferrera (1 July 2019 – 17 September 2019 )
 Bertrand Crasson (17 September 2019 – 7 May 2020 )
 Carlos Fangueiro (1 July 2020 –)

References

External links
F91 Dudelange official website 
official facebook
instagram

 
Football clubs in Luxembourg
Sports teams in Dudelange
Association football clubs established in 1991
1991 establishments in Luxembourg